John Hoyt (born John McArthur Hoysradt; October 5, 1905 – September 15, 1991) was an American actor. He began his acting career on Broadway, later appearing in numerous films and television series.

He is perhaps best known for his film and TV roles in The Lawless (1950), When Worlds Collide (1951), Julius Caesar (1953), Blackboard Jungle (1955), Spartacus (1960), Cleopatra (1963), Flesh Gordon (1974), and Gimme a Break!

Early life
Hoyt was born John McArthur Hoysradt in Bronxville, New York, the son of Warren J. Hoysradt, an investment banker, and his wife, Ethel Hoysradt, née Wolf. He attended the Hotchkiss School and Yale University, where he served on the editorial board of campus humor magazine The Yale Record. He received a bachelor's and a master's degree from Yale. He worked as a history instructor at the Groton School for two years.

Stage

Hoyt made his Broadway debut in 1931 in William Bolitho's play Overture. Some of his other Broadway credits in the early 1930s include Miracle at Verdun (1930), Lean Harvest (1931), and Clear All Wires (1932). He also performed with several regional theater groups, and then joined Orson Welles's Mercury Theatre in 1937;  he remained a member of the troupe until he moved to Hollywood in 1945. Hoyt continued to perform regularly in Broadway productions throughout the 1930s and into the 1940s. In this period, he was cast in a range of plays, such as Valley Forge (1934), Ziegfeld Follies of 1936 (1935), The Masque of Kings (1936), Storm Over Patsy (1936), and Caesar (1937). He also worked as a stand-up comedian, sometimes both acting and doing comedy on the same day. His impersonation of Noël Coward was so remarkable  that he was hired for the original cast of the Broadway comedy The Man Who Came to Dinner (1939), in which he played Beverley Carlton.

Film
Hoyt shortened his surname in 1945, the year before his film debut in O.S.S. He played the strict Principal Warneke in the 1955 film Blackboard Jungle, starring Glenn Ford. He played an industrialist in the 1951 film When Worlds Collide. Hoyt appeared in one Shakespearean film: MGM's Julius Caesar, reprising the role of Decius Brutus (or Decimus Junius Brutus Albinus), whom he had played in the 1937 Mercury Theatre production. In 1952, he played Cato in Androcles and the Lion. In 1953, he portrayed Elijah in the biblical film Sins of Jezebel.

Television

Regular cast roles
Hoyt played Colonel Barker on The Adventures of Rin Tin Tin, Grandpa Stanley Kanisky, Dolph Sweet's onscreen father, on Gimme a Break!, J.L. Patterson on Hey, Mulligan, Martin Peyton in Return to Peyton Place, and Dr. Kievoy on Tom, Dick and Mary.

Guest appearances
On Gunsmoke, in a 1957 episode titled "Bureaucrat", Hoyt played the part of Rex Propter, a government agent sent to Dodge City, Kansas, to determine why the town had such a bad reputation for gun violence. Hoyt also made five guest appearances on Perry Mason, including in the role of defendant Joseph Harrison in the 1958 episode "The Case of the Prodigal Parent", as C. Philip Reynolds in the 1958 episode " The Case of the Curious Bride", as the title character and defendant William Harper Caine in the 1961 episode "The Case of the Resolute Reformer", and as Darwin Norland in the 1963 episode "The Case of the Libelous Locket". He guest-starred, as well, on Crossroads.

Hoyt was cast in 1958 as rancher Clete Barron in the episode "Trouble in Paradise Valley" of Frontier Doctor. In 1958 and 1959, he performed in two episodes of Richard Diamond, Private Detective, appearing as Burnison in "The George Dale Case" and as Harding, Sr. in "Murder at the Mansion". Later in 1959, on Laramie, Hoyt portrayed mentally troubled military officer Colonel Brandon in "The General Must Die". The same year, he was cast as Antoine Rigaud in the episode "About Roger Mowbray" on Riverboat. He gave a moving performance as Civil War veteran Captain Josiah Perry, a man deranged by grief over the loss of his son, in the Rifleman episode of 11/7/1960 titled "The Martinet".

In 1959, Hoyt was cast as John Cavanagh in "The Mourning Cloak", an episode of the crime drama Bourbon Street Beat. About this time, he guest-starred on The Alaskans and Pony Express. Also in 1959, Hoyt was cast in an episode ("Three Legged Terror") on The Rifleman, playing the character Gus Fremont, the cruel uncle of Johnny Clover (Dennis Hopper). In 1960 and 1961, he appeared in the episodes "Burnett's Woman" and "The Salvation of Killer McFadden" of The Roaring 20s. Hoyt also appeared on The Untouchables in the 1960 episode "The Big Squeeze".

Hoyt guest-starred on at least three sitcoms: Bringing Up Buddy, Hogan's Heroes, and Petticoat Junction (1966, episode: Hooterville Valley Project, as: Mr. Fletcher). He was cast as Dr. Philip Boyce in the pilot episode of Star Trek ("The Cage"), and he appeared twice during the second season of The Twilight Zone in the episodes "Will the Real Martian Please Stand Up?" and "The Lateness of the Hour". He also performed as the KAOS agent Conrad Bunny in "Our Man in Toyland" on Get Smart, as General Beeker in "Hail to the Chief" on Voyage to the Bottom of the Sea, and as Dr. Mendoza in "I Was a Teenage Monster" on The Monkees. He guest-starred as Colonel Hollis in "Military School" on The Beverly Hillbillies. He appeared in "Herman's Happy Valley" (as Barnie Walters, 1965) and "The Sleeping Cutie" on The Munsters.

In 1964, Hoyt appeared in 3 episodes of The Outer Limits, most notably "The Bellero Shield." He played the role of an extraterrestrial with large eyes who says, "In all the universes, in all the unities beyond the universes, all who have eyes have eyes that speak." Less than two weeks after this episode's broadcast, alleged alien abductees Betty and Barney Hill provided a description of their alien abductors. Skeptic Martin Kottmeyer notes that the description is notably similar to Hoyt's appearance as the extraterrestrial on the show.

He was also a guest player in "The 14-Karat Gold Trombone" and "The Interview" episodes of The George Burns and Gracie Allen Show. Because of his stern demeanor, the writers had him play opposite to the befuddled way strangers usually reacted to Gracie Allen's convoluted behavior. In the teleplay of "The Interview", Hoyt simply would not tolerate Gracie's antics and immediately removed himself from the room—twice.

He also appeared as Bertrand Russell and as Voltaire in episodes of Steve Allen's PBS series Meeting of Minds in the late 1970s. He appeared as Sire Domra in episode 21 "Baltar's Escape" of Battlestar Galactica.

Personal life and death
Hoyt was married twice, first to Marian Virginia Burns from 1935 to 1960, with whom he had one child, and later to Dorothy Oltman Haveman from 1961 to 1991, when he died of lung cancer 3 weeks before his 86th birthday in Santa Cruz, California.

Complete filmography

 O.S.S. (1946) as Col. Paul Meister
 My Favorite Brunette (1947) as Dr. Lundau
 The Unfaithful (1947) as Det. Lt. Reynolds
 Brute Force (1947) as Spencer
 To the Ends of the Earth (1948) as George C. Shannon
 Winter Meeting (1948) as Stacy Grant
 Sealed Verdict (1948) as Gen. Otto Steigmann
 The Decision of Christopher Blake (1948) as Mr. Caldwell
 The Bribe (1949) as Gibbs
 The Lady Gambles (1949) as Dr. Rojac
 The Great Dan Patch (1949) as Ben Lathrop
 Trapped (1949) as John Downey
 Everybody Does It (1949) as Wilkins
 The Marionette Mystery (1950 TV movie)
 Outside the Wall (1950) as Jack Bernard
 The Lawless (1950) as Ed Ferguson
 The Company She Keeps (1951) as Judge Kendall
 Inside Straight (1951) as Flutey Johnson
 Quebec (1951) as Father Antoine
 New Mexico (1951) as Sergeant Harrison
 Lost Continent (1951) as Michael Rostov
 The Desert Fox: The Story of Rommel (1951) as Field Marshal Wilhelm Keitel (uncredited)
 When Worlds Collide (1951) as Sydney Stanton
 Loan Shark (1952) as Vince Phillips
 Androcles and the Lion (1952) as Cato
 The Black Castle (1952) as Count Steiken
 Julius Caesar (1953) as Decius Brutus
 Sins of Jezebel (1953) as Elijah / Narrator
 Casanova's Big Night (1954) as Maggiorin
 The Student Prince (1954) as Prime Minister
 Désirée (1954) as Talleyrand
 For the Defense (1954 TV movie)
 The Big Combo (1955) as Nils Dreyer
 Blackboard Jungle (1955) as Mr. Warneke
 The Purple Mask (1955) as Rochet
 Moonfleet (1955) as Magistrate Maskew
 The Girl in the Red Velvet Swing (1955) as William Travers Jerome
 Trial (1955) as Ralph Castillo
 Alarm (1956 TV movie)
 The Conqueror (1956) as Shaman
 Forever, Darling (1956) as Bill Finlay
 Mohawk (1956) as Butler
 The Come On (1956) as Harold King, alias Harley Kendrick
 Wetbacks (1956)  as Steve Bodine
 Death of a Scoundrel (1956) as Mr. O'Hara
 Sierra Stranger (1957) as Sheriff
 God Is My Partner (1957) as Gordon Palmer
 Baby Face Nelson (1957) as Samuel F. Parker
 The Beast of Budapest (1958) as Prof. Ernst Tolnai
 Attack of the Puppet People (1958) as Mr. Franz
 The Ten Commandments (1959 TV movie)
 Riot in Juvenile Prison (1959)
 Curse of the Undead (1959) as Dr. John Carter
 Never So Few (1959) as Col. Reed
 Spartacus (1960) as Caius
 Merrill's Marauders (1962) as Gen. Joseph Stilwell
 The Virginian (1963 episode "To Make This Place Remember") as Judge Harper
 Boston Terrier (1963 TV movie)
 Cleopatra (1963) as Cassius
 X: The Man with the X-ray Eyes (1963) as Dr. Willard Benson
 The Glass Cage (1964) as Lt. Max Westerman
 The Time Travelers (1964) as Varno
 Two on a Guillotine (1965) as Attorney Carl Vickers
 Memorandum for a Spy (1965 TV movie)
 Young Dillinger (1965) as Dr. Wilson
 Operation C.I.A. (1965) as Wells
 Gunpoint (1966) as Mayor Osborne
 Duel at Diablo (1966) as Chata
 T.H.E. Cat (1967 episode "The Blood-Red Night") as Carver Parmiter
 Winchester 73 (1967 TV movie)
 Panic in the City (1968) as Dr. Milton Becker
 Hogan's Heroes (1969) as General Von Behler
 The Intruders (1970 TV movie)
 Welcome Home, Johnny Bristol (1972 TV movie)
 Flesh Gordon (1974) as Professor Gordon
 The Winds of Kitty Hawk (1978 TV movie) as Professor Samuel Langley
 In Search of Historic Jesus (1979 documentary) as Synagogue Man #1 
 A Great Ride (1979)
 Nero Wolfe (1979 TV movie)
 The Forty Days of Musa Dagh (1982) as General Waggenheim
 Desperately Seeking Susan (1985) as Space Commander
 Alvin Goes Back to School (1986 TV movie) as Mr. Quickstudy

References

External links

 
 
 
 
 John Hoyt(Aveleyman)

1905 births
1991 deaths
20th-century American male actors
American male film actors
American male stage actors
American male television actors
Deaths from lung cancer in California
Hotchkiss School alumni
Male actors from Los Angeles
Male actors from New York (state)
Male actors from Santa Cruz, California
People from Bronxville, New York
Western (genre) television actors
Yale University alumni